Turris yeddoensis, common name the comely pleurotoma, is a species of sea snail, a marine gastropod mollusk in the family Turridae, the turrids.

Description
The length of the shell attains 86 mm.

Distribution
This marine species occurs off Japan.

References

External links
 Jousseaume F. (1883). Description d'espèces et genres nouveaux de mollusques. Bulletin de la Société Zoologique de France. 8: 186-204, pl. 10

yeddoensis
Gastropods described in 1883